The following is a timeline of the history of the city of Pskov, Russia.

Prior to 20th century

 903 - Pleskov founded.
 1156 - Mirozhsky Monastery established.
 1168 - Plotnitskii borough created.
 1212 - Partially burned by an Estonian raid under Lembitu.
 1240 - City captured by the Livonian Brothers of the Sword.
 1266 - City wall constructed by Daumantas of Pskov.
 14th C. Joined the Hanseatic League.
 1348 - City becomes independent from the Novgorod Republic per Treaty of Bolotovo.
 1473 - Cave Church of the Dormition of the Theotokos built.
 1510 - City taken by forces of Basil Ivanovich of the Grand Duchy of Moscow.
 1540 -  built (approximate date).
 1581 - August: Siege of Pskov begins.
 1582 - February: Siege of Pskov ends.
 1615 - City besieged by Swedish forces.
 1650 - .
 1699 - Trinity Cathedral rebuilt and consecrated.
 1843 - Catholic church built.
 1889 - Riga Bridge (Velikaya River) opens.
 1897 - Population: 29,555.
 1898 - Bridge built to Zapskovye quarter.

20th century

 1903 - Archaeological museum active.
 1911 -  opens.
 1913 - Population: 38,300.
 1917 - March: Tsar Nicholas II abdicates while in Pskov.

 1919
 25–26 May: Estonian War of Independence – city captured by Estonians.
 24 August: Withdrawal of Estonian forces.
 Soviet Russia in power.
 1920 -  active.
 1930's - Pskov Airport founded.
 1939 - Population: 59,898.
 1940 - June: Soviet 8th Army invaded Estonia and Latvia from the city.
 1941
 9 July: City occupation by German forces begins
 City renamed "Pleskau."
  begins.
 Famine.
 Dulag transit camp for prisoners of war established by the Germans.
 1942
 February: Forced labour camp for Jewish men and women established by the Germans.
 Stalag 372 prisoner-of-war camp established by the Germans.
 1943
 May: Forced labour camp for Jewish men and women dissolved.
 May: Forced labour camp for men established by the Germans.
 May: Stalag 372 camp dissolved.
 1944
 February: Bombing by Russia, thousands of people killed.
 23 July: City occupation by German forces ends.
 Pskovskaya Pravda newspaper in publication.
 1958 - Pskov Electric Machine-Building Plant active.
 1959 - Population: 80,448.
 1960 - Pskov State Polytechnic Institute established.
 1965 - Population: 108,000.
 1967 -  opens.
 1985 - Population: 194,000.
 1989 - Population: 203,789.
 1990 -  opens.
 1991 - August: Soviets launched an attack on Tallinn, Estonia from Pskov during the 1991 Soviet coup d'état attempt.
 1996 - Yevgeny Mikhailov elected governor of the Pskov Oblast.
 2000
 Mikhail Khoronen elected mayor.
 Catholic cathedral construction begins.
 City becomes part of the North Western Federal District.

21st century
 2009 -  becomes mayor.
 2010 - Population: 203,279.
 2010 - Established Pskov State University.

See also
 Pskov history
 
 Other names of Pskov, e.g. Pleskau, Pleskov
 Timelines of other cities in the Northwestern Federal District of Russia: Kaliningrad, St. Petersburg

References

This article incorporates information from the Russian Wikipedia.

Bibliography

 
 
 
 
 
 
 
  (fulltext)

External links

 
pskov
Years in Russia